Ménilmontant is a 1936 French comedy drama film directed by René Guissart and starring Gabriel Signoret, Pierre Larquey and Josette Day. It takes its name from the Ménilmontant area of Paris.

Cast
 Gabriel Signoret as Le père Chinelle 
 Pierre Larquey as Le père Jos 
 Josette Day as Julie 
 Thérèse Dorny as Toinon 
 Valentine Tessier as Madame Collinet 
 Bernard Lancret as Roland 
 Georges Bever as Le père Martin 
 Armand Lurville as Ganduron 
 Robert Seller as Hardel 
 André Rehan as Le domestique 
 Lise Hestia as La concierge
 Lona Dilva as La chanteuse des rues 
 Marcel Mouloudji as Toto 
 Jean-Pierre Thisse as Le petit chanteur 
 Jacques Chevalier as Lulu 
 Roger Doucet as Le joueur d'accordéon 
 Paulette Élambert as Riquette 
 Jacotte Muller as Zette 
 Ginette Nassula as Nini

References

Bibliography 
 Dayna Oscherwitz & MaryEllen Higgins. The A to Z of French Cinema. Scarecrow Press, 2009.

External links 
 

1936 films
French comedy-drama films
1936 comedy-drama films
1930s French-language films
Films directed by René Guissart
Films set in Paris
French black-and-white films
1930s French films